Bishop Pius Thomas D'Souza is the current serving bishop of the Roman Catholic Diocese of Ajmer, India.

Early life and education 
Pius Thomas D'Souza was born in Agrar, Mangalore, India on 4 May 1954. He completed his doctorate in canon law from the Pontifical Urban University, Rome.

Priesthood 
Pius was ordained a priest on 28 March 1982 for the diocese of Lucknow initially but later he was Incardinated to the diocese of Bareilly, India on 19 January 1989.

Episcopate 
He was Appointed Bishop of Ajmer on 3 November 2012 by Pope Benedict XVI and consecrated by Salvatore Pennacchio on 19 January 2013 at the Immaculate Conception Cathedral.

References 

Living people
1954 births
21st-century Roman Catholic bishops in India
Bishops appointed by Pope Benedict XVI
Pontifical Urban University alumni